In mathematics, a Dirichlet L-series is a function of the form

where  is a Dirichlet character and s a complex variable with real part greater than 1. It is a special case of a Dirichlet series. By analytic continuation, it can be extended to a meromorphic function on the whole complex plane, and is then called a Dirichlet L-function and also denoted L(s, χ).

In the course of the proof, Dirichlet shows that  is non-zero at s = 1. Moreover, if χ is principal, then the corresponding Dirichlet L-function has a simple pole at s = 1. Otherwise, the L-function is entire.

Euler product
Since a Dirichlet character χ is completely multiplicative, its L-function can also be written as an Euler product in the half-plane of absolute convergence:

where the product is over all prime numbers.

Primitive characters

Results about L-functions are often stated more simply if the character is assumed to be primitive, although the results typically can be extended to imprimitive characters with minor complications. This is because of the relationship between a imprimitive character  and the primitive character  which induces it:

(Here, q is the modulus of χ.) An application of the Euler product gives a simple relationship between the corresponding L-functions:

(This formula holds for all s, by analytic continuation, even though the Euler product is only valid when Re(s) > 1.) The formula shows that the L-function of χ is equal to the L-function of the primitive character which induces χ, multiplied by only a finite number of factors.

As a special case, the L-function of the principal character  modulo q can be expressed in terms of the Riemann zeta function:

Functional equation

Dirichlet L-functions satisfy a functional equation, which provides a way to analytically continue them throughout the complex plane. Let χ be a primitive character modulo q, where q > 1. One way to express the functional equation is:

In this equation, Γ denotes the Gamma function; a is 0 if χ(−1) = 1, or 1 if χ(−1) = −1; and

where τ&hairsp;(&hairsp;χ) is a Gauss sum:

It is a property of Gauss sums that |τ&hairsp;(&hairsp;χ)&hairsp;| = q1/2, so |ɛ&hairsp;(&hairsp;χ)&hairsp;| = 1.

Another way to state the functional equation is in terms of

The functional equation can be expressed as:

The functional equation implies that  (and ) are entire functions of s. (Again, this assumes that χ is primitive character modulo q with q > 1. If q = 1, then  has a pole at s = 1.)

For generalizations, see: Functional equation (L-function).

Zeros

Let χ be a primitive character modulo q, with q > 1.

There are no zeros of L(s, χ) with Re(s) > 1. For Re(s) < 0, there are zeros at certain negative integers s:
 If χ(−1) = 1, the only zeros of L(s, χ) with Re(s) < 0 are simple zeros at −2, −4, −6, .... (There is also a zero at s = 0.)
 If χ(−1) = −1, then the only zeros of L(s, χ) with Re(s) < 0 are simple zeros at −1, −3, −5, ....
These are called the trivial zeros.

The remaining zeros lie in the critical strip 0 ≤ Re(s) ≤ 1, and are called the non-trivial zeros. The non-trivial zeros are symmetrical about the critical line Re(s) = 1/2. That is, if  then  too, because of the functional equation. If χ is a real character, then the non-trivial zeros are also symmetrical about the real axis, but not if χ is a complex character. The generalized Riemann hypothesis is the conjecture that all the non-trivial zeros lie on the critical line Re(s) = 1/2.

Up to the possible existence of a Siegel zero, zero-free regions including and beyond the line Re(s) = 1 similar to that of the Riemann zeta function are known to exist for all Dirichlet L-functions: for example, for χ a non-real character of modulus q, we have

for β + iγ a non-real zero.

Relation to the Hurwitz zeta function 
The Dirichlet L-functions may be written as a linear combination of the Hurwitz zeta function at rational values. Fixing an integer k ≥ 1, the Dirichlet L-functions for characters modulo k are linear combinations, with constant coefficients, of the ζ(s,a) where a = r/k and r = 1, 2, ..., k. This means that the Hurwitz zeta function for rational a has analytic properties that are closely related to the Dirichlet L-functions. Specifically, let χ be a character modulo k.  Then we can write its Dirichlet L-function as:

See also

Generalized Riemann hypothesis
L-function
Modularity theorem
Artin conjecture
Special values of L-functions

Notes

References 
 

 
 
 
 
 
 

Zeta and L-functions